The 1985 Giro d'Italia was the 68th running of the Giro. It started in Palermo, on 16 May, with a  prologue and concluded in Lucca, on 9 June, with a  individual time trial. A total of 180 riders from twenty teams entered the 22-stage race, that was won by Frenchman Bernard Hinault of the  team. The second and third places were taken by Italian Francesco Moser and American Greg LeMond, respectively.

Moser led the race for the first two days after winning the opening prologue. He lost the lead to Giuseppe Saronni after his team won the stage three team time trial. Upon conclusion of the event's fourth stage, Roberto Visentini won sufficient time to take the race leader's maglia rosa from Saronni. Visentini held the jersey for a total of eight days of racing, during which the race traversed the Dolomites, before losing it to Hinault after the stage 12 time trial. Hinault then successfully defended his lead through the Alps, all the way to the race's finish.

Amongst the other classifications that the race awarded, Johan van der Velde of Vini Ricordi-Pinarello won the points classification, José Luis Navarro of Gemeaz Cusin-Zor won the mountains classification, and Sammontana-Bianchi's Alberto Volpi completed the Giro as the best neo-professional in the general classification, finishing tenth overall. Alpilatte-Olmo-Cierre finishing as the winners of the team classification, ranking each of the twenty teams contesting the race by lowest cumulative time.

Teams

A total of twenty teams were invited to participate in the 1985 Giro d'Italia, six of which were based outside of Italy. Each team sent a squad of nine riders, which meant that the race started with a peloton of 180 cyclists. The presentation of the teams – where each team's roster and manager are introduced in front the media and local dignitaries – took place at the Verona Arena on 15 May. From the riders that began this edition, 135 made it to the finish in Lucca.

The teams entering the race were:

Pre-race favorites

The starting peloton did include the 1984 winner, Francesco Moser. Two–time champion Bernard Hinault entered the race with a strong supporting  team as he sought a third overall victory. Author Bill McGann believed that going into the race Hinault was "the world's most potent racing machine" and that Moser would have to ride very well in order to repeat as champion.  Mario Fossati of La Repubblica named Moser, Saronni, Hinault, and Greg LeMond as contenders for the overall crown. LeMond rode the Giro d'Italia for the first time this edition. Spanish rider Marino Lejarreta decided not to race the Vuelta a España in favor of racing the Giro. Luis Gómez, of El Pais, believed Lejarreta to be in top form going into the race and that he could challenge for the overall victory. Javier Dalmases, an El Mundo sportswriter, believed that there was no clear favorite for the race. Prominent French rider Laurent Fignon did not participate in the race due to an inflamed Achilles tendon.

Route and stages

The route for the 1985 edition of the Giro d'Italia was revealed to the public by head organizer Vincenzo Torriani on 16 February 1985. Three of these eleven stages had summit finishes: stage 4, to Selva di Val Gardena; stage 14, to Gran Sasso d'Italia; and stage 20, to Valnontey di Cogne. The organizers chose to include two rest days. When compared to the previous year's race, the race was  longer and contained the same number of time trials and rest days. In addition, this race contained the same number of stages, but one more set of half stages.

Luis Gómez, an El Pais writer, believed that the route was designed to benefit the Italian participants, with there being three individual time trials, the team time trial being flat, and most stages being primarily flat. El Mundo writer Javier Dalmases believed that the route was purposefully less mountainous so that an Italian would win the race, citing that this route favored the likes of Giuseppe Saronni or Moreno Argentin. La Stampa'''s Gian Paolo Ormezzano thought overall easiness of the course — the few mountains and summit finishes — added some mystery as to who could win.

Race overview

The event began with a  prologue around the city of Verona. The brief time trial leg was won by Francesco Moser, who finished seven seconds faster than the second placed rider. The following day was the first mass-start stage of the race, which culminated in a bunch sprint that was won by Atala-Ofmega-Campagnolo's Urs Freuler. The second stage was a team time trial that stretched . Del Tongo-Colnago won the leg and their rider, Giuseppe Saronni, earned enough of an advantage to take race lead and don the race leader's maglia rosa. The third stage saw Saronni expand upon his lead by winning the leg after out-sprinting the rest of the leading group. The fourth stage took the race into the Dolomites, as well as featuring a summit finish on Selva di Val Gardena. The group of five stayed together to the finish as Saiz took the stage victory by edging out Hinault. Visentini took the race lead after Saronni finished over four minutes behind, while another Italian favorite Francesco Moser finished two minutes behind.

The route went through more mountains in the fifth stage. With large amounts of rain, the peloton made a truce and the stage saw few attacks. A three-man breakaway formed with around twelve kilometers to go. The riders stayed together and all sprinted for the stage win, which was originally won by Roberto Pagnin; however, due to his non-linear sprint line that interfered with the two other riders, he was relegated to second place and the original second-place finisher, Emanuele Bombini, was promoted and declared winner. The next day of racing ended with a bunch sprint won by Frank Hoste, but a crash with two kilometers to go from the finish saw general classification contenders Visentini and Saronni, as well as others, lose twenty seconds. The seventh stage saw a six-man breakaway survive and finish ahead of the peloton by almost two minutes as Orlando Maini won the day.

The twelfth stage of the race was  individual time trial. Hinault won the stage by fifty-three seconds over Moser. Hinault's time gains were enough to give him the race lead by a minute and fourteen seconds. The thirteenth stage saw Freuler win his second stage of the race by virtue of a sprint finish. Italian Franco Chioccioli won the mountainous fourteenth leg of the event after attacking on the descent of the third climb of the day. The following day of racing began with a twenty-man breakaway forming off the front of the peloton; however, all but one rider was caught with ten kilometers remaining. With under five kilometers left, another four-man attack group formed, of which 's Ron Kiefel survived. Kiefel caught the lone remaining rider in front and went on to win the stage as the peloton crossed the line three seconds behind. This was the first stage victory by an American in the history of the Giro d'Italia. The sixteenth stage saw the day of racing end with a field sprint which was won by Saronni.

Race leader Hinault and his team, allowed a breakaway to get almost a twenty-minute advantage over the peloton during the race's seventeenth stage, before other general classification contenders' teams stepped in to help with the chase. The attack group reached the finish line around ten minutes faster than the peloton. Swiss rider Daniel Gisiger won the stage ahead of Giovanni Mantovani. Paolo Rosola won his second stage of the event as the eighteenth stage resulted in a bunch sprint. The following day's race route was altered the night before by Torriani, which removed six kilometers off the climb of Great St Bernard Pass, while it still contained the full climb of the Cima Coppi, the Simplon Pass. The stage saw a large group of fifty-three riders cross the finish line together, with Moser at the head, taking his second stage victory of the event. Former race leader Visentini, after losing a significant amount of time during the stage 16 individual time trial, abandoned the race during the nineteenth stage.

Stage 20 was a brief  that featured a seventeen kilometer ascent to finish the leg. La Vie Claire drove a hard pace throughout the stage and fractured the peloton in the process. American Andrew Hampsten attacked with around nineteen kilometers to go and won the stage by a minute over the second-place finisher. The penultimate stage of the race was culminated with a field sprint, which was won by Freuler. The final stage of the race was a  individual time trial that stretched from Lido di Camaiore to Lucca. Moser was able to win the stage by seven seconds on race leader Hinault, which was not enough to overcome Hinault and take first. This meant Hinault won his third Giro d'Italia.

Six riders achieved multiple stage victories: Freuler (stages 1, 13, and 21), Moser (prologue and stages 19 and 22), da Silva (stages 8b and 10), Allocchio (stages 8a and 11), Saronni (stages 3 and 16), and Rosola (stages 9 and 18). Stage wins were achieved by nine of the twenty competing squads, six of which won multiple stages. Del Tongo-Colnago collected a total of five wins through the team time trial, Saronni, Bombini (stage 5), and Hoste (stage 6). Atala-Ofmega-Campagnolo amassed a total of four stage wins through Freuler and Gisiger (stage 17). Malvor-Bottecchia also secured four stage wins through da Silva and Allocchio. Sammontana-Bianchi obtained two stage victories with Rosola. Gis Gelati-Trentino Vacanze collected two stage successes with Moser. 7-Eleven recorded two stage wins with Kiefel (stage 15) and Hampsten (stage 20). Cilo-Aufina, Alpilatte-Olmo-Cierre, and La Vie Claire all won a single stage at the Giro, the first through Seiz (stage 4), the second through Maini (stage 7), and the third by Hinault (stage 12), and the fourth with Chioccioli (stage 14).

Classification leadership

Four different jerseys were worn during the 1985 Giro d'Italia. The leader of the general classification – calculated by adding the stage finish times of each rider, and allowing time bonuses for the first four finishers on mass-start stages – wore a pink jersey. This classification is the most important of the race, and its winner is considered as the winner of the Giro.

For the points classification, which awarded a purple (or cyclamen) jersey to its leader, cyclists were given points for finishing a stage in the top 15; additional points could also be won in intermediate sprints. The green jersey was awarded to the mountains classification leader. In this ranking, points were won by reaching the summit of a climb ahead of other cyclists. Each climb was ranked as either first, second or third category, with more points available for higher category climbs. The Cima Coppi, the race's highest point of elevation, awarded more points than the other first category climbs. The Cima Coppi'' for this Giro was the Simplon Pass. The first rider to cross the Simplon Pass was Colombian rider Reynel Montoya. The white jersey was worn by the leader of young rider classification, a ranking decided the same way as the general classification, but considering only neo-professional cyclists (in their first three years of professional racing). Although no jersey was awarded, there was also one classification for the teams, in which the stage finish times of the best three cyclists per team were added; the leading team was the one with the lowest total time.

The rows in the following table correspond to the jerseys awarded after that stage was run.

Final standings

General classification

Points classification

Mountains classification

Young rider classification

Team classification

References

Footnotes

Citations

 
Giro d'Italia by year
Giro d'Italia
Giro d'Italia
May 1985 sports events in Europe
June 1985 sports events in Europe
1985 Super Prestige Pernod International